This is a list of selective and agricultural high schools run by the Department of Education. Entry to these schools is managed centrally by the department's Selective High School and Opportunity Class Placement Unit. Prospective students sit the Selective High Schools Test (typically in March of Year 6) and are allocated places at schools according to their profile mark, out of 300, which comprises both exam and school marks. Students may list up to four preferred schools.

A number of other government and non-government high schools also select their students based on merit; these include, for example, creative and performing arts schools, and some private schools.

Schools 

1 Previously known as Manly Boys High School (1954–1983) and Manly High School (1983–2002).

2 Year of amalgamation of Dover Heights High School and Vaucluse High School.

3 Previously known as Malvina High School (1965–2001) and foundation year for selective stream.

Creative and performing arts high schools

The New South Wales Department of Education operates creative and performing arts high schools in communities throughout the state. These schools aim to foster excellence in creative fields while teaching the same core syllabus as other state-run high schools and are accorded a high degree of autonomy by the department in selecting students and teaching staff. The schools boast specialised facilities and equipment and competition for places is acute.

Sports high schools 
The New South Wales Department of Education operates seven specialist sports high schools in local communities across New South Wales. Each of the schools deliver a comprehensive education to local students and, by application and, based on merit and talent, students are selected to participate in each school's talented sports program.

See also 

 Selective school (New South Wales)
 List of schools in New South Wales

References 

High
 *